Gherasim Luca (23 July 1913 – 9 February 1994) was a Romanian surrealist theorist and poet. Born Salman Locker in Romania and also known as Costea Sar, and Petre Malcoci, he became an apatrid after leaving Romania in 1952.

Biography 

Born in Bucharest the son of Jewish tailor Berl Locker (died 1914), he spoke Yiddish, Romanian, German, and French. During 1938, he traveled frequently to Paris where he was introduced to surrealists. World War II and the official antisemitism in Romania forced him into local exile. During the pre-Communist period of Romanian independence, he founded a surrealist artists group with Gellu Naum, Paul Păun, Virgil Teodorescu and Dolfi Trost.

His first publications, including poems in French followed. He was the inventor of cubomania and, in 1945 with Dolfi Trost, authored "Dialectic of Dialectic", a manifesto of the surrealist movement Surautomatism. Harassed in Romania and caught while trying to flee the country, he left Romania in 1952, and moved to Paris through Israel.

There he worked among others with Jean Arp, Paul Celan, François Di Dio and Max Ernst, producing numerous collages, drawings, objects, and text-installations. From 1967, his reading sessions took him to Stockholm, Oslo, Geneva, New York City, and San Francisco. The 1988 TV-portrait by Raoul Sanglas, Comment s'en sortir sans sortir, made him famous for a larger readership.

At the end of the 1980s, Luca's residence building in Montmartre was deemed insalubrious by the French authorities. In order to be relocated to another building, he had to justify his citizenship. As he had been without one ever since leaving Romania, he acquired French citizenship by marrying his long time partner.    

On 9 February 1994, at the age of 80, he committed suicide by jumping into the Seine.

Selected works 

Luca initially wrote most of his poetic works in his native Romanian. Two collections of these, Inventatorul Iubirii and Un lup văzut printr-o lupă, published in Bucharest in 1945, were translated into English (The Inventor of Love and Other Works) by Julian and Laura Semilian and published by Black Widow Press in 2009.

With the authorisation of éditions Corti, a forthcoming chapbook of his poems translated by Fiona Sze-Lorrain will be featured in "Poetry International", Issue no. 15, Spring 2010.
 Un loup à travers une loupe, Bucharest, 1942. Poems in prose, initially published in Romanian. Later translated into French by Gherasim Luca. Apart from Ce Château Pressenti, they remained unpublished in French until 1998, Éditions José Corti
 Quantitativement aimée, Éditions de l'Oubli, Bucharest, 1944
 Le Vampire passif, Éditions de l'Oubli, Bucharest 1945
 Dialectique de la dialectique, together with Dolfi Trost, Éditions surréalistes, Bucharest, 1945
 Les Orgies des Quanta, Éditions de l'Oubli, Bucharest 1946
 Amphitrite, Éditions de l’Infra-noir, Bucharest 1945
 Le Secret du vide et du plein, Éditions de l'Oubli, Bucharest 1947
 Héros-Limite, Le Soleil Noir, Paris 1953 with an engraving and three drawings
 Ce Château Pressenti, Méconnaissance, Paris 1958, with frontispiece and engraving by Victor Brauner. This poem is part of Un loup à travers une loupe
 La Clef, Poème-Tract, 1960, Paris
 L'Extrême-Occidentale, Éditions Mayer, Lausanne 1961 with 7 engravings by Jean Arp, Brauner, Max Ernst, Jacques Hérold, Wifredo Lam, Roberto Matta, Dorothea Tanning
 La Lettre, no editor mentioned, Paris, 1960
 Le Sorcier noir, with Jacques Hérold, Paris 1996
 Sept slogans ontophoniques, Brunidor, Paris 1963 with engravings by Augustin Fernandez, Enrique Zanartu, Gisèle Celan-Lestrange, Jacques Hérold.
 Poésie élémentaire, Éditions Brunidor, Vaduz, Liechtenstein, 1966
 Apostroph'Apocalypse, Éditions Upiglio, Milan 1967 with fourteen engravings by Wifredo Lam
 Sisyphe Géomètre, Éditions Givaudan, Paris, 1967 Book-sculpture designed by Piotr Kowalski
 Droit de regard sur les idées, Brunidor, Paris, 1967
 Déférés devant un tribunal d'exception, no editor mentioned, Paris, 1968.
 Dé-Monologue, Brunidor, Paris, 1969 with two engravings by Micheline Catty
 La Fin du monde, Éditions Petitthory, Paris 1969 with frontispiece by Micheline Catty and five drawings by Ghérasim Luca
 Le Tourbillon qui repose, Critique et Histoire, 1973
 Le Chant de la carpe, Le Soleil Noir, Paris, 1973 with sonogram and sculpture by Kowalski
 Présence de l'imperceptible, Franz Jacob, Châtelet; with no date of publication
 Paralipomènes, Le Soleil Noir, Paris 1976 with a cubomania by Luca
 Théâtre de Bouche, Criapl'e, Paris, 1984 with an engraving and nine drawings by Micheline Catty.
 Satyres et Satrape, Éditions de la Crem, Barlfeur, 1987
 Le Cri, Éditions Au fil de l'encre, Paris, 1995

Others:
 La proie s'ombre
 La voici la voie silanxieuse
 Levée d'écrou, Éditions José Corti, 2003

In English translation:
 The Passive Vampire, Twisted Spoon, 2009. Tr. by Krzysztof Fijalkowski.
 The Inventor of Love & Other Works, Black Widow Press, 2009. Tr. by Laura and Julian Semilian.
 Self-Shadowing Prey, New York: Contra Mundum Press, 2012. Translation and introduction by Mary Ann Caws.
 Something is Still Present and Isn't, of What's Gone. A bilingual anthology of avant-garde and avant-garde inspired Rumanian poetry, Aracne editrice, 2018.  Edited and translated by Victor Pambuccian.

In Spanish translation: 
  La zozobra de la lengua, El Desvelo Ediciones, Santander, 2018, 368 p.  (translation in Spanish of French and Romanian poems by Catalina Iliescu, Vicente Gutiérrez Escudero, Jesús García Rodríguez y Eugenio Castro; introductory study by Vicente Gutiérrez Escudero).
  Héroe límite, añosluz editora, Buenos Aires, 2022. Tr. by Mariano Fiszman.

Filmography 
 Comment s'en sortir sans sortir (1988), directed by Raoul Sangla, in which Gherasim Luca recites eight of his poems in a very sober setting.

References

External links 
 Hyperion: On the Future of Aesthetics, Vol. VII, No. 3 (October 2013). Special issue on Luca with articles in English & French and texts by Luca.
 Page about Gherasim Luca in French
 "Passionnément", poem and audio document of the poet's performance (in French, authorized by copyright holder)
 "Quart d'heure de culture métaphysique", poem and audio document of the poet's performance (in French, authorized by copyright holder)
 English translation of some of his poems:
 
 
 
 
 
 Dominique Carlat: Ghérasim Luca l'intempestif

Romanian collage artists
20th-century Romanian poets
Romanian male poets
Romanian surrealist writers
Romanian writers in French
Jewish artists
Jewish poets
Writers from Bucharest
Jewish Romanian writers
Romanian emigrants to France
Suicides by drowning in France
1913 births
1994 suicides
20th-century Romanian male writers
1994 deaths